The Album is the ninth album released by English progressive rock band Caravan. It was recorded at Farmyard Studios, Little Chalfont, Buckinghamshire in July 1980.

Background and recording
After a year of inaction followed by Caravan being dropped from Arista Records, Caravan reformed with a line up of Pye Hastings, Geoff Richardson, Dave Sinclair, Richard Sinclair and Richard Coughlan. After attempting to record a live album, Richard Sinclair dropped out of the line up and was replaced by Dek Messecar. The group decided to scrap the live album when it was learned that a studio album could be recorded with the same budget.

Members Dave Sinclair and Geoff Richardson contributed to songwriting duties alongside main songwriter Pye Hastings. The material moved in the direction of shorter songs and more mainstream instrumentation than previous albums.

The only promotional work undertaken was an appearance on French television to promote the "Heartbreaker" single release in France. Caravan's performance was interrupted by the news of the failed assassination attempt of John Paul II in Rome.

Track listing
Side one

Side two

Bonus tracks on Eclectic remaster (2004)

Personnel
Caravan
 Pye Hastings – vocals,  guitar
 Geoff Richardson – guitar, viola, flute, vocals
 Dave Sinclair – organ, piano, electric piano, synthesizer
 Dek Messecar – bass guitar, vocals
 Richard Coughlan – drums

Additional personnel
 Stephen W. Tayler – engineer, mixing
 Ian Morais – engineer, mixing
 Terry King – production co-ordinator

Releases information
 LP Kingdom CDKVL 9003 (1980)
 CD Eclectic 1011 (2004 remaster)

See also
 Music of the United Kingdom

References

Caravan (band) albums
1980 albums